In the pterygoid processes of the sphenoid, above the pterygoid fossa is a small, oval, shallow depression, the scaphoid fossa, which gives origin to the Tensor veli palatini.

It is not the same as and has to be distinguished from the scaphoid fossa of the external ear or pinna.

References

External links
 Diagram - look for #28 (source here)

Bones of the head and neck